Events from the year 1270 in Ireland.

Incumbent
Lord: Henry III

Events
 Battle of Áth-an-Chip: The army of the Kingdom of Connacht routs the English army near Carrick-on-Shannon.
 The cathedral on the Rock of Cashel is completed.

Births
Tanaide Mor mac Dúinnín Ó Maolconaire

References

 
1270s in Ireland
Ireland
Years of the 13th century in Ireland